Rodrigo Raúl Resquín Jara (born 23 August 1989) is a Paraguayan professional footballer who plays as a midfielder.

Career

Guabirá
In 2011, Resquìn formed part of Bolivian side Guabirá.

Deportivo Capiatá
In 2012, Resquín achieved promotion with Deportivo Capiatá from the División Intermedia to the Primera División for the 2013 season. Later, Resquin was ignored by the club and then formed part of a group of players which trained with Edgar Denis, which played in a friendly against Olimpia Asunción. Concluding the friendly, Olimpia Asunción coach Ever Hugo Almeida chose Resquin to train with the club.

Olimpia Asunción
Three days after signing with Olimpia in 2013, Resquin started in a game against Tacuary at the Estadio Manuel Ferreira.

Santiago Morning
Resquin played for Chile’s Primera B club Santiago Morning as midfielder. In October 2014, Resquin was substituted into a game in the 87th minute in a 0-0 away draw against Deportivo La Serena.

Sportivo Carapeguá
In March 2015, Resquin was incorporated as a new signing to Sportivo Carapeguá for the División Intermedia season.

Martin Ledesma
In 2017, Resquín played for Club General Martin Ledesma in the División Intermedia.

Resistencia
In 2018, Resquin formed part of Resistencia's squad for the División Intermedia season.

Rubio Ñu
In 2021, Resquin joined Club Rubio Ñu for the División Intermedia season.

References

External links
 
 Sport.de Profile
 

1989 births
Living people
Paraguayan footballers
Paraguayan expatriate footballers
Club Olimpia footballers
Deportivo Capiatá players
Santiago Morning footballers
Primera B de Chile players
Expatriate footballers in Chile
Association football midfielders